Germán Olano Airport is an airport serving Puerto Carreño, the capital of Vichada Department in Colombia. It is also known as Puerto Carreño Airport (Aeropuerto Puerto Carreño).

The Puerto Carreno non-directional beacon (Ident: PCR) and VOR-DME (Ident: PTC) are located on the field.

Airlines and destinations

Passenger

Cargo

Accidents and incidents
On December 20, 2016, Aerosucre Flight 157 crashed while taking off from the airport after failing to become airborne. It was reported that 5 aboard the Boeing 727-200 died, and 1 crew member survived with injuries.

See also
Transport in Colombia
List of airports in Colombia

References

External links
Puerto Carreño Airport at OpenStreetMap
German Olano Airport at OurAirports

Puerto Carreño Airport at FallingRain

Airports in Colombia
Buildings and structures in Vichada Department